Matthias Endres (born July 6, 1852 in Buffalo, New York) was an American lawyer and politician from New York.

Life
He attended the public schools, and then became a compositor, and later a gas fitter. He studied law, was admitted to the bar, and practiced in Buffalo.

He was a member of the New York State Assembly (Erie Co., 2nd D.) in 1888, 1889, 1890 and 1891.

He was a member of the New York State Senate (31st D.) in 1892 and 1893; and was Chairman of the Committee on Canals, and of the Committee on Indian Affairs.

Sources
 The New York Red Book compiled by Edgar L. Murlin (published by James B. Lyon, Albany NY, 1897; pg. 403f, 503f and 508)
 Biographical sketches of the members of the Legislature in The Evening Journal Almanac (1892)
 New York State Legislative Souvenir for 1893 with Portraits of the Members of Both Houses by Henry P. Phelps (pg. 12)

1852 births
Year of death missing
Democratic Party New York (state) state senators
Politicians from Buffalo, New York
Democratic Party members of the New York State Assembly
Lawyers from Buffalo, New York